Pneumatics (from Greek   ‘wind, breath’) is a branch of engineering that makes use of gas or pressurized air.

Pneumatic systems used in industry are commonly powered by compressed air or compressed inert gases. A centrally located and electrically-powered compressor powers cylinders, air motors, pneumatic actuators,  and other pneumatic devices.  A pneumatic system controlled through manual or automatic solenoid valves is selected when it provides a lower cost, more flexible, or safer alternative to electric motors, and hydraulic actuators.

Pneumatics also has applications in dentistry, construction, mining, and other areas.

Gases used in pneumatic systems

Pneumatic systems in fixed installations, such as factories, use compressed air because a sustainable supply can be made by compressing atmospheric air. The air usually has moisture removed, and a small quantity of oil is added at the compressor to prevent corrosion and lubricate mechanical components.

Factory-plumbed pneumatic-power users need not worry about poisonous leakage, as the gas is usually just air. Any compressed gas other than air is an asphyxiation hazard—including nitrogen, which makes up 78% of air. Compressed oxygen (approx. 21% of air) would not asphyxiate, but is not used in pneumatically-powered devices because it is a fire hazard, more expensive, and offers no performance advantage over air. Smaller or stand-alone systems can use other compressed gases that present an asphyxiation hazard, such as nitrogen—often referred to as OFN (oxygen-free nitrogen) when supplied in cylinders.

Portable pneumatic tools and small vehicles, such as Robot Wars machines and other hobbyist applications are often powered by compressed carbon dioxide, because containers designed to hold it such as soda stream canisters and fire extinguishers are readily available, and the phase change between liquid and gas makes it possible to obtain a larger volume of compressed gas from a lighter container than compressed air requires. Carbon dioxide is an asphyxiant and can be a freezing hazard if vented improperly.

History
The origins of pneumatics can be traced back to the first century when ancient Greek mathematician Hero of Alexandria wrote about his inventions powered by steam or the wind.

German physicist Otto von Guericke (1602 to 1686) further developed the idea. He invented the vacuum pump, a device that can draw out air or gas from the attached vessel. He demonstrated the vacuum pump to separate the pairs of copper hemispheres using air pressures. The field of pneumatics has changed considerably over the years. It has moved from small handheld devices to large machines with multiple parts that serve different functions.

Comparison to hydraulics
Both pneumatics and hydraulics are applications of fluid power. Pneumatics uses an easily compressible gas such as air or a suitable pure gas—while hydraulics uses relatively incompressible liquid media such as oil.

Advantages of pneumatics
Simplicity of design and control—Machines are easily designed using standard cylinders and other components, and operate via simple on-off control.
Reliability—Pneumatic systems generally have long operating lives and require little maintenance. Because gas is compressible, equipment is less subject to shock damage. Gas absorbs excessive force, whereas fluid in hydraulics directly transfers force. Compressed gas can be stored, so machines still run for a while if electrical power is lost.
Safety—There is a very low chance of fire compared to hydraulic oil. New machines are usually overload safe to a certain limit.

Advantages of hydraulics
 Fluid does not absorb any of the supplied energy.
 Capable of moving much higher loads and providing much lower forces due to the incompressibility.
 The hydraulic working fluid is practically compressible, leading to a minimum of spring action. When hydraulic fluid flow is stopped, the slightest motion of the load releases the pressure on the load; there is no need to "bleed off" pressurized air to release the pressure on the load.
 Highly responsive compared to pneumatics.
 Supply more power than pneumatics.
 Can also do many purposes at one time: lubrication, cooling and power transmission.

Pneumatic logic

Pneumatic logic systems (sometimes called air logic control) are sometimes used for controlling industrial processes, consisting of primary logic units like:

And units
Or units
Relay or booster units
Latching units
Timer units
 Fluidics amplifiers with no moving parts other than the air itself

Pneumatic logic is a reliable and functional control method for industrial processes. In recent years, these systems have largely been replaced by electronic control systems in new installations because of the smaller size, lower cost, greater precision, and more powerful features of digital controls. Pneumatic devices are still used where upgrade cost, or safety factors dominate.

Examples of pneumatic systems and components

Air brakes on buses and trucks
Air brakes on trains
Air compressors
Air engines for pneumatically powered vehicles
Barostat systems used in neurogastroenterology and for researching electricity
Cable jetting, a way to install cables in ducts
Dental drill
Compressed-air engine and compressed-air vehicles
Gas Chromatography
Gas-operated reloading
Holman Projector, a pneumatic anti-aircraft weapon
HVAC control systems
Inflatable structures
Lego pneumatics can be used to build pneumatic models
Pipe organ
Electro-pneumatic action 
Tubular-pneumatic action
Player piano
Pneumatic actuator
Pneumatic air guns
Pneumatic bladder
Pneumatic cylinder
Pneumatic launchers, a type of spud gun
Pneumatic mail systems
Pneumatic motor
Pneumatic tire
Pneumatic tools:
Jackhammer used by road workers
Pneumatic nailgun
Pressure regulator
Pressure sensor
Pressure switch
Launched roller coaster
Vacuum pump
Vacuum sewer

See also
Compressed air
Ozone cracking - can affect pneumatic seals

Pneudraulics
History of pneumatic power

Notes

References
 Brian S. Elliott, Compressed Air Operations Manual, McGraw Hill Book Company, 2006, .
 Heeresh Mistry, Fundamentals of Pneumatic Engineering, Create Space e-Publication, 2013, .

External links

  Four Ways to Boost Pneumatic Efficiency